The 2003 Bank of the West Classic was a women's tennis tournament played on outdoor hard courts that was part of the Tier II Series of the 2003 WTA Tour. It was the 32nd edition of the tournament and took place at the Taube Tennis Center in Stanford, California, United States, from July 21 through July 27, 2003. Second-seeded Kim Clijsters won the singles title, her second at the event after 2001, and earned $ 97,000 first-prize money.

Finals

Singles

 Kim Clijsters defeated.  Jennifer Capriati, 4–6, 6–4, 6–2
 It was Clijsters' 5th singles title of the year and the 15th of her career.

Doubles

 Cara Black /  Lisa Raymond defeated  Cho Yoon-jeong /  Francesca Schiavone, 7–6(7–5), 6–1

References

External links
 ITF tournament edition details
 Tournament draws

Bank of the West Classic
Silicon Valley Classic
Bank of the West Classic
Bank of the West Classic
Bank of the West Classic